Sarah Louise Christine Chalke (born August 27, 1976) is a Canadian actress and model. She is known for portraying Elliot Reid on the NBC/ABC comedy series Scrubs, the second Becky Conner on the ABC sitcom Roseanne, Stella Zinman on the CBS sitcom How I Met Your Mother, and Beth Smith on Adult Swim's adult animated science-fiction series Rick and Morty. She also had a recurring role on the third season of the ABC/TBS sitcom Cougar Town. She has done voice acting for the Netflix series Paradise PD and was a star cast member in Firefly Lane, which premiered on Netflix in February 2021. As of November 2021, Chalke voices Stella, the tactical officer in the Netflix series Dogs in Space.

Early life
Chalke was born at the Ottawa Civic Hospital on August 27, 1976, in Ottawa, Ontario, and was raised in North Vancouver, British Columbia. She is the middle of three daughters born to Douglas and Angela Chalke (née Piper). 

Her mother is from Rostock, Germany. According to a Scrubs commentary track, she used to attend the German school in her hometown twice a week. Her first language is English, but she speaks German fluently and French "fairly well". This was incorporated into her Scrubs character, Elliot Reid, who spoke German and French at the same levels. Chalke graduated from Handsworth Secondary School in North Vancouver in 1994.

Career
Chalke's acting career began at age eight when she began appearing in musical theatre productions. At 12, she became a reporter on the Canadian children's show KidZone. In 1993, she took over the role of Rebecca Conner-Healy on Roseanne after Lecy Goranson left the series; Chalke made a cameo appearance as a different character in the Roseanne episode "Halloween: The Final Chapter" (#178, originally aired October 31, 1995) after Goranson returned. Chalke later returned to the role of Becky after Goranson departed for a second time. After the show ended, Chalke returned briefly to Canada, where she starred in the CBC Television drama Nothing Too Good for a Cowboy (1998–1999).

In 2001, she was cast as Dr. Elliot Reid in the NBC comedy series Scrubs and she would be a cast member for all nine seasons until the series ended its run in 2010. She has appeared in several feature films, including Ernest Goes to School and Cake.
She appeared in Channel 101's The 'Bu with The Lonely Island, a parody of the hit show The O.C., but was credited as "Pamela Fenton". In 2007, she appeared as a supporting character in Chaos Theory, which starred fellow Canadian Ryan Reynolds. In 2008, Chalke became the spokesperson for a line of women's underwear by Hanes that included a series of commercials directed by her Scrubs co-star Zach Braff. In 2008 and 2009, she made appearances in the CBS sitcom How I Met Your Mother as Stella Zinman. In early 2011, she starred in the CBS television series Mad Love, a romantic comedy which debuted as a midseason replacement and was cancelled after only one season was produced.

Chalke was signed by former Scrubs executive producer Bill Lawrence to play the love interest of Bobby Cobb in the series Cougar Town. She appeared in multiple episodes in the third season. Chalke starred in the ABC comedy series How to Live with Your Parents (For the Rest of Your Life), which premiered April 3, 2013, and which was cancelled one month later. She played Polly, a single and very uptight divorced mother who found herself moving back in with her parents (Elizabeth Perkins and Brad Garrett) because of the economic downturn. Also in 2013, she played a frantic mother named Casey Hedges in the Grey's Anatomy season 9 episode "Can't Fight This Feeling". Chalke also voices Beth on the show Rick and Morty.

On April 28, 2017, it was announced that a revival of Roseanne was in the works, and that most of the original cast and some of the producers would return for the revival series. On May 16, 2017, it was confirmed that eight episodes of the show were greenlit by ABC and would air mid-season in 2018 with Chalke returning, but playing a role other than Becky Conner. Following its cancellation, she later returned for a guest appearance in its spinoff series, The Conners.

In February 2021, Chalke co-starred alongside Katherine Heigl in the role of Kate Mularkey for the Netflix series Firefly Lane.

Personal life
In December 2006, Chalke became engaged to Canadian lawyer Jamie Afifi, after three years of dating. In September 2022, Chalke announced that they had called off the engagement and "separated some time ago". They have two children together, a son born in December 2009, and a daughter born in May 2016. Her son was diagnosed at two-years-old with Kawasaki disease.

Activism
Chalke's aunt and grandmother died from breast cancer that was undiagnosed while in its early stages. She has since encouraged breast cancer detection and prevention, and starred in the Lifetime movie Why I Wore Lipstick to My Mastectomy. She is an ambassador for the Audrey Hepburn Children's Foundation. Chalke also made an appearance in a short video parodying a National Organization for Marriage's advertisement opposing same-sex marriage, "Gathering Storm". She was the 2009 ambassador for the Susan G. Komen Passionately Pink for the Cure program, for which she also designed a T-shirt.

Filmography

Film

Television

References

External links

 

Living people
1976 births
Actresses from British Columbia
Actresses from Ottawa
Canadian child actresses
Canadian emigrants to the United States
Canadian film actresses
Canadian people of German descent
Canadian television actresses
Canadian voice actresses
People from North Vancouver
20th-century Canadian actresses
21st-century Canadian actresses